The GFA Super Knockout Cup, Grenada Super Cup or simply known as the GFA Cup, is the biggest cup tournament held for association football teams in Grenada. It is run and overseen by the Grenada Football Association. It is held for football clubs competing in the GFA Premier League, GFA First and Second Division annually.

Paradise FC International are the most successful club in this tournament; they have four GFA Cups and have never lost a final.

Winners 

 2009 -    Paradise FC International bt                       Police of Grenada FC
 2010 -    Eagles Super Strikers FC        bt  Grenada Boys' Secondary School FC
 2011 -    Hurricanes SC                   drw   Grenada Boys' Secondary School FC                       [Hurricane on pen]
 2012 -    Paradise International FC                     4-4 Hard Rock FC                   [6-5 pen]
 2013 -    Hard Rock FC                   5-2 Hurricanes SC
 2014 -    Hurricanes SC                   3-1 Grenada Boys' Secondary School FC
 2015 -    Paradise International FC                     1-0 Hurricanes SC
 2016 -    Paradise International FC                     4-1 Hard Rock FC
 2017 -    Hurricanes SC                   2-1 St. John's Sports Club
 2018 -    N/A (not held)
 2019 -    Hard Rock FC                                  3-2 Hurricanes SC

References 

Sports leagues established in 2009
2009 establishments in Grenada